Aaj Ki Radha is a 1979 Bollywood film directed by Mukul Dutt. The film stars Mahendra Sandhu, Rehana Sultan, Waheeda Rehman, Danny Denzongpa and Ranjeet.

Cast
Mahendra Sandhu
Rehana Sultan
Waheeda Rehman
Danny Denzongpa
Ranjeet

Soundtrack

External links
 

1979 films
1970s Hindi-language films